Mrs. Tendulkar is an Indian comedy series which aired on SAB TV. The show follows the daily lives of Suhaas and Vibhavari Tendulkar, set in the Gangaram Godbole Sahkari Bank colony. Suhaas stays at home while Vibhavari is the manager of the Gangaram Godbole Sahkari Bank. Because he does all the chores in the house (traditionally done exclusively by women), the housewives of the colony call Suhaas Mrs. Tendulkar.

Concept
The show is based on the colony's culture and focuses on the Tendulkars' assimilation into it. It is set in a Maharashtrian backdrop, but Gujarati culture is also highlighted. It portrays and at times makes fun of gender roles in Indian culture. The Tendulkars' gender role reversals are the subject of derision in the colony; since the colony members resist change in their comfortable lives, the arrival of the Tendulkar family upsets them as many of their set notions are challenged. In this way, the show implicitly embeds social commentary in its humour.

Cast and characters
 Deven Bhojani as Mr. Suhas Tendulkar/Guddi
 Kishori Godbole as Mrs. Vibhavari Tendulkar/Vibhu
 Afia Tayebali as Kitty Tendulkar
 Rishabh Sharma as Sunny Tendulkar
 Shivansh Kotia as Mandar/Chendu Tendulkar
 Deepak Parek as Mr. Ganesh Upasani
 Manjushree Kulkarni as Mrs. Pratibha Upasani
 Amit Phatak as Mr. Virendra Patekar
 Kirti Mehendale Pendharkar as Mrs. Renuka Patekar
 Richa Bhadra as Mayuri Trivedi
 Sameer Shah as Mr. Umesh Trivedi
 Amita Choksi as Mrs. Urmila Trivedi
 Bharat Ganeshpure as Mr. Ramdas Pagare
 Smita Saravade as Mrs. Kamal Pagare
 Vikas Patil as Prasad Pagare
 Dheeraj Dhoopar as Sushant
 Ankita Bhargava as Priyanka
 Khushbu Thakkar in cameo

References

External links
 Mrs. Tendulkar official site on SAB TV
 Mrs. Tendulkar casts and character details

Sony SAB original programming
Indian comedy television series
2011 Indian television series debuts
2011 Indian television series endings
Hats Off Productions